Conway Common Lands State Forest is a  state forest in Conway, New Hampshire, in the United States. It was organized a few years after the establishment of the New Hamsphire Forestry Commission. Purchase of the lands and protection involved negotiation with a granite company based in Maine.

See also

List of New Hampshire state forests

References

External links
 U.S. Geological Survey Map at the U.S. Geological Survey Map Website. Retrieved December 13th, 2022.

Landforms of Coös County, New Hampshire
New Hampshire state forests
Protected areas of Carroll County, New Hampshire